Angel of H.E.A.T. is an American science fiction softcore sex comedy film directed and produced by Myrl A. Schreibman and starring Marilyn Chambers.

Cast
 Marilyn Chambers as Angel Harmony
 Stephen Johnson as Mark Wisdom
 Mary Woronov as Samantha Vitesse
 Milt Kogan as Harry Covert
 Remy O'Neill as Andrea Shockley
 Dan Jesse as Albert Shockley
 Gerald Okamura as Hans Zeisel
 Randy West as "Mean" Wong (credited as Andy Abrams)
 Harry Townes as Peter Shockley
 Jerry Riley as Randy Small
 Hal Kant as George
 Janis Thrash as "Tiny"
 Tony D'Andrea as Faux Pas Emcee
 Nelson Kirby as High Roller
 Jitty Dufresne as Marsha Nutts
 Tanya Santos as Lola Bolts
 Robin Fenton as Martina
 Maxine Lee Walrod as Hologram Lady
 Steve Cloud as himself

Production
Angel of H.E.A.T. was filmed in 1981 under the title The Protectors, Book #1. The film was shot in the Lake Tahoe region.

Release
Lor of Variety stated that by 1983 the theatrical market for films like Angel of H.E.A.T. had changed so much that the film was unreleased and shown as "cable-tv filler" and as a home video title. The film was first released in 1983, and on DVD on January 13, 2004 by Monterey Video.

Reception
Lor gave the film a negative review, noting poorly executed martial arts sequences, and that the film "wanders for the first few reels, with lots of dumb puns, bare breasts and failed gags".  In his book reviewing horror and science fiction films, Donald Willis declared the film to be "failed semi-camp" and that it was "iffy even as a showcase for Marilyn Chambers" noting that the filmmakers seemed to believe that the narrative would be of more interest than Chambers' role which, he considered a "bad miscalculation".

References

Footnotes

Sources

External links
 

Softcore pornography
American science fiction comedy films
American spy comedy films
1980s sex comedy films
American sex comedy films
1980s science fiction comedy films
1980s pornographic films
1983 comedy films
1983 films
1980s English-language films
1980s American films